Marc Primanti is a former American football kicker who played college football for North Carolina State University.  He won the Lou Groza Award and earned consensus All-American honors in 1996 after successfully completing 20-of-20 field goals during the season.

College career
After graduating from Coatesville Area High School in Coatesville, Pennsylvania, Primanti attended North Carolina State University and was invited to play for the NC State Wolfpack football team as a walk-on placekicker in 1992.  He was redshirted in 1992 and saw no game action in 1993 and 1994.  In 1995, Primanti became the starting kicker for the Wolfpack and earned a full athletic scholarship.  He went 11-of-13 for field goals and 27-of-28 for extra points during the season.  In 1996, he completed a perfect 20-of-20 field goal attempts, as well as a perfect 24-for-24 in extra points.  He had a season-long 48-yard field goal in a game against Alabama.  Primanti set an Atlantic Coast Conference (ACC) record for consecutive field goals with 27, which spanned his two seasons as a starter.  He won the Lou Groza Award following his perfect placekicking season, awarded to the top college football placekicker in the nation, also earned consensus first-team All-American recognition in 1996.

Life after football
Primanti earned a degree in business management at North Carolina State. He is currently a business partner for FS Series, an event production and timing company based in North Carolina.

References

Living people
All-American college football players
American football placekickers
NC State Wolfpack football players
People from Coatesville, Pennsylvania
Players of American football from Raleigh, North Carolina
Players of American football from Pennsylvania
Year of birth missing (living people)